Bolshoye Kuzminskoye is a rural locality (a selo) in Bavlenskoye Rural Settlement, Kolchuginsky District, Vladimir Oblast, Russia. The population was 717 as of 2010. There are 5 streets.

Geography 
Bolshoye Kuzminskoye is located 19 km northeast of Kolchugino (the district's administrative centre) by road. Tovarkovo is the nearest rural locality.

References 

Rural localities in Kolchuginsky District